Carlos Padilla may refer to:

 Carlos Padilla Sr. (1909–1962), Filipino Olympic boxer and actor
 Carlos Padilla Jr. (born 1934/35), Filipino boxing referee and actor
 Carlos Padilla (footballer) (1934–2014), Honduran footballer and manager
 Carlos Padilla (politician) (born 1944), Governor of Nueva Vizcaya, Philippines